Diastictis albovittalis is a moth in the family Crambidae. It was described by Eugene G. Munroe in 1956. It is found in Puebla, Mexico.

References

Moths described in 1956
Spilomelinae
Moths of Central America